Andre Chance Brooks (born 20 August 2003) is an English professional footballer who plays as a winger for Sheffield United.

Career
Born in Sheffield, Brooks joined the youth academy of Sheffield United at the age of 8. He signed his first professional contract with the club on 21 May 2021 and was originally a part of their development side. On 6 August 2022, he joined Bradford (Park Avenue) on loan in the National League, where hade 7 appearances and scored 1 goal. He returned to Sheffield United in September 2022. He made his professional debut as a late substitute in a 5–2 EFL Championship win over Burnley on 5 November 2022.

Personal life
Born in England, Brooks is of Jamaican descent.

References

External links
 

2003 births
Living people
Footballers from Sheffield
English footballers
English sportspeople of Jamaican descent
Sheffield United F.C. players
Bradford (Park Avenue) A.F.C. players
Association football wingers
English Football League players
National League (English football) players